Spirit of Youth is a 1938 boxing film directed by Harry L. Fraser and starring then-heavyweight world champion Joe Louis in a story with similarities to his own real life. (According to IMDb, the Spanish title is La vida de Joe Louis, which translates to The Life of Joe Louis.)

Plot
A rising boxer is led astray by a woman.

Cast
 Joe Louis as Joe Thomas
 Clarence Muse as Frankie Walburn
 Edna Mae Harris as Mary Bowdin
 Mae Turner as Flora Bailey
 Cleo Desmond as Nora Thomas
 Mantan Moreland as Creighton "Crickie" Fitzgibbons
 Jewel Smith as Duke Emerald
 Tom Southern as Dr. Bowdin
 Jess Lee Brooks as Jeff Thomas (as Jesse Lee Brooks)
 Marguerite Whitten as Eleanor Thomas (as Margaret Whitten)
 Clarence Brooks as Speedy
 The Plantation Choir as Church Choir
 The Creole Chorus as The Creole Chorus
 The Big Apple Dancers as Dancers

External links

American black-and-white films
American sports drama films
American boxing films
Films directed by Harry L. Fraser
1930s sports drama films
1938 drama films
1938 films
1930s English-language films
1930s American films